The Temple of No is a 2016 video game by Crows Crows Crows.

References 

 http://www.polygon.com/2016/6/20/11982668/crows-crows-crows-the-temple-of-no-free-game
 http://www.eurogamer.net/articles/2016-06-21-the-stanley-parable-designer-releases-free-game-the-temple-of-no
 http://www.pcgamer.com/the-temple-of-no-is-a-new-freebie-from-crows-crows-crows/
 https://www.rockpapershotgun.com/2016/06/21/the-temple-of-no/

2016 video games
Browser games
Video games developed in the United Kingdom